Rock Road is a St. Louis MetroLink station. It is primarily a MetroBus transfer and commuter station featuring 191 park and ride spaces located near 70th Street in Pagedale, Missouri. The station's name comes from nearby St. Charles Rock Road, an important east–west artery in St. Louis County.

In 2010, Metro's Arts in Transit program commissioned the work Honey, Where’s my Metro Pass? by Nick Lang and Thad Duhigg for installation at this station. Some of Lang's students visited the Rock Road location and noted the common objects used by commuters. After documenting these visits, the students created maquettes that laid the groundwork for the sculpture. The artists expanded on the students’ ideas and fabricated this sculpture, which depicts the contents of an average Metro rider’s pockets at a very large scale.

Station layout

References

External links 
 St. Louis Metro

MetroLink stations in St. Louis County, Missouri
Red Line (St. Louis MetroLink)
Railway stations in the United States opened in 1993